Roshan Sebastian is a Singer, Music Producer & Mixing/Mastering Engineer who is working in the Indian Film Industry. He was awarded, The Expressive Singer, in Airtel Super Singer Junior 1 in 2007. He was also the Runner Up In Vijay TV Airtel Super Singer Junior Season 2 in 2009-2010.

About Roshan Sebastian 
Roshan Sebastian, son of K.D Sebastian & Mini Sebastian was born on 19 June 1997 at Kannur, Kerala. His mother tongue is Malayalam. Even though he was born in Kerala, he has spent most of his time in Tamil Nadu—first in Coimbatore and now in Chennai. His singing earned him an award for the 'Best Expressive Singer' in Airtel Super Singer Junior Season 1.. He completed his graduation from Loyola College, Chennai in the year 2018. Apart from academics, he has been learning Hindusthani Vocals from Shri.Kuldeep Sagar and have completed Senior Diploma and was also learning piano from Shri.Sadanandam, the guitarist of Music Director Ilayaraja. After his graduation, he has completed his course in Music Production from Shri.Hentry Kuruvila, who is one of the programmers of A.R Rahman. Right now he is working as a music programmer in the film industry.

Career
He entered Airtel Super Singer Junior Season 1 in the year, 2007, and became the semi-finalist and was awarded "Best Expressive Singer". Followed by that in the year, 2008, he participated in Gandharva Sangeetham in Kairali TV and became the first runner up and received "Yesudas Award" from the legend Dr.K. J. Yesudas. In the year, 2009, he again participated in Vijay TV Airtel Super Singer Junior (season 2) and was among the top 53 finalists. He is also nicknamed as "Paadum Ilaya Nila" — the senior paadum nila being none other than legendary S. P. Balasubrahmanyam. In June 2021, he lend his vocals for a Telugu music video "Daare Leda" , composed by Vjai Bulganin, written by KK and featuring Satyadev Kancharana and Roopa Koduvayur. It is produced by Nani. The music video was released in Tamil as "Vaanam Thoandraadhoa".

Achievements
 Roshan won second place in Kairali Gandharva Sangeetham competition and received "Yesudas Award" from the legend Dr.K. J. Yesudas.
 In the semi-finals of Airtel Super Singer Junior 1, Roshan was awarded "Best Expressive Singer".
 Roshan was among the top 3 finalists on Airtel Super Singer Junior 2
 He is also nicknamed as "Paadum Ilaya Nila"—the senior paadum nila being none other than legendary SP Balasubramaniam.

References

1997 births
Living people
Indian male singers
Indian child singers
Singers from Kannur